S. B. Patil Institute of Management is an institute of higher education in Pune, India, under the aegis of Pimpri Chinchwad Education Trust. It is affiliated to Savitribai Phule Pune University and was established in 2009. 

It provides two-year courses leading to MBA and PhD degrees and is accredited by the All India Council for Technical Education, Approved by Directorate of Technical Education (DTE) Mumbai- Government of Maharashtra State.

S. B. Patil Institute of Management offers Full time 2 years MBA course under Savitribai Phule Pune University.

Footnotes

Patil
Patil